There are several people with the surname Deller:
Alfred Deller (1912–1979), English countertenor.
Harris Deller (b. 1947), American ceramics artist.
Jeremy Deller (born 1966), English artist.
Keith Deller (born 1959), English professional darts player.
Mark Deller, (born 1938), English countertenor, son of Alfred Deller.
Martin Deller, a Canadian musician.
Reginald Deller (born 1933), English cricketer.
Roy Deller (1913–1988), Australian rules footballer
William "Bill" Deller (born 1943), a leading Australian rules football field umpire

Dəlilər or Dalliar or Dallyar or Dälilär or Dolyar or Dəllər may also refer to:
Dəllər Cəyir, Azerbaijan
Dəllər Cırdaxan, Azerbaijan
Dəlilər, Agsu, Azerbaijan
Dəlilər, Saatly, Azerbaijan
Dəllər, Shamkir, Azerbaijan
Dalilar, Iran
Deliler, Çorum
Deliler, Osmancık

See also
 Dəlilər (disambiguation)

English-language surnames